Antonín Barák (born 11 July 1956) is a Czech rowing coxswain. He competed for Czechoslovakia in the men's coxed four event at the 1980 Summer Olympics.

References

External links
 
 

1956 births
Living people
Czech male rowers
Olympic rowers of Czechoslovakia
Rowers at the 1980 Summer Olympics
Sportspeople from Brno
Coxswains (rowing)